Vashi Nanwani Dominguez (born 1978) is a Spanish entrepreneur.

Early life 
Dominguez was born in Puerto de la Cruz, Tenerife, where he grew up. He was educated at Casa Azul School and the University of  La Laguna where he studied law but left in the second year.
 
Dominguez began his career importing technology from China, building up his own chain of shops before selling the whole business for profit in 1999.

Diamond Manufacturers 
In September 2013, Diamond Manufacturers rebranded to Vashi.com.

In 2017, VASHI opened its first flagship store in Piccadilly, London.

References 

Living people
1978 births
People from Puerto de la Cruz
British businesspeople
Spanish expatriates in England
Spanish people of Indian descent